Radnor is an unincorporated community in Wayne County, West Virginia, United States.

The community may have been named after the local Radnor (or Ridenour) family.

References

Unincorporated communities in Wayne County, West Virginia
Unincorporated communities in West Virginia